Fabio Di Michele Sanchez (born 14 March 2003) is a German-Italian professional footballer who plays as a left-back for Eerste Divisie club NAC Breda, on loan from VfL Wolfsburg.

Career
Di Michele Sanchez joined NAC Breda on loan from Wolfsburg in July 2022. He made his debut in the Eerste Divisie on 5 August 2022, in a 1–0 win against Helmond Sport at the Rat Verlegh Stadion. In November 2022 he suffered a serious injury and returned to Germany for rehabilitation.

References

2003 births
Living people
German footballers
Association football defenders
Eerste Divisie players
VfL Wolfsburg players
NAC Breda players
German expatriate footballers
German expatriate sportspeople in the Netherlands
Expatriate footballers in the Netherlands